The Groke (Swedish name , Finnish name ) is a fictional character in the Moomin stories created by Tove Jansson. She appears as a ghost-like, hill-shaped body with two cold staring eyes and a wide row of white shiny teeth. In the book Who Will Comfort Toffle?, it is mentioned that she has a tail, but it has never been seen. Wherever she stands, the ground below her freezes and plants and grass die. She leaves a trace of ice and snow when she walks the ground. Anything that she touches will freeze. On one occasion, she froze a campfire by sitting down on it. She seeks friendship and warmth, but she is declined by everyone and everything, leaving her in her cold cavern on top of the Lonely Mountains.

On one occasion in a comic, however, she was hailed as a heroine when she, in her constant search for warmth, extinguished a forest wildfire by sitting on it. In another comic, Sniff has made a magical potion with seemingly random effects. In curiosity, he drips a few drops on an ant which then transforms into the Groke. It is never made clear if this is how the Groke came to be, or if the ant transformed to another creature of the same type.

The Groke is a melancholic and lonely character. Agneta Rehal-Johansson has argued that various other characters, such as Moomintroll or Moominmamma, identify with or are represented by her loneliness.

Books she appears in 
3. Finn Family Moomintroll - This is the first appearance of the Groke, and she is generally played as a frightening villain, though Sniff expresses a bit of sympathy for her, at one point moving himself to tears with a speech on how awful it must be to be so alone.
4. The Exploits of Moominpappa - Here, several characters refer to the Groke eating people: the Joxter claims to have a cousin who was eaten by the Groke, and the young Moominpappa saves the Hemulen's Aunt from being eaten by the Groke. She is never actually seen to eat anyone, though, and since the book is written as Moominpappa's memoirs, it's quite possible (and quite in character) that he exaggerated things a little in order to make himself look more heroic.
6. Moominland Midwinter - The Groke makes a couple of cameo appearances, though she comes across as far less villainous and more to be pitied than feared. Too-Ticky even expresses sympathy for her when she wants to warm herself by the fire at the celebration for the sun, and ends up not only scaring everyone away but inadvertently putting out the fire with her own coldness.
8. Moominpappa at Sea - In this work, the Groke keeps on going to Moominpappa's island to beg Moomintroll to show her his lantern flame. This story builds on the new angle of the Groke that Too-Ticky offered in Moominland Midwinter, and is generally seen as the most sympathetic portrayal of her in the books, even containing short passages written from her point of view: constantly craving warmth and light but unable to get either.
Who Will Comfort Toffle? - Toffle bites her as he is saving Miffle, though it is not known whether she was holding Miffle hostage or not.
Comic strips - While the Groke is not a major character in the strips, she is  alluded to several times. The second storyline in the strip, Moomin and the Brigands, features Sniff creating an “Elixir of Life”, which is revealed to turn things into their opposites. After accidentally dumping the potion on a bug, the bug is transformed into a creature resembling the Groke, who chases Sniff before being (presumably) drowned.

Adaptations 
There have been various adaptations of the Moomin books on television. The Groke appears differently in the 1969 anime version of the Moomins, where she is depicted as white and depressed. In the Polish Moomin TV series, she is more like the character in the novels, but darker and bestial.

The Japanese-Dutch anime series Moomin includes her as an antagonist. In the Japanese dub, she is referred to as Morran. She is distinctive from her first appearance in the series for her intimidating appearance and the loud growling sounds that she utters. Dubs in other languages use different growls, as well as different malevolent theme music, which begins to play every time she appears. The Groke's primary introductions were in episode 6, 7 and 22 of the series. It was not until episode 37 that she was presented more sympathetically.

She also appears in the episode "Night of the Groke" in the 2019 series, in which she make a ghostly moaning sound as she slowly slides along, leaving an ice trail behind her as she searches for fire. She is first encountered by Moomintroll, Snufkin, and Sniff, who manage to escape her. Afterwards, the Groke attempts to head to  Moominpappa and Moominmamma’s tent, in which they have a fire. Sniff manages to resist his greed and uses a large sheet of ice to put out the fire, but Snufkin begins feeling sorry for the Groke and leads her out to sea via placing two lanterns on a log.

Notes

References 

 
 

Literary characters introduced in 1948
Moomin characters
Female characters in animation
Female characters in comics
Female characters in literature
Fictional characters who can turn intangible
Fictional ghosts
Fictional characters with ice or cold abilities